Richard Robertson (24 May 1877 – 9 May 1936) was an Australian rules footballer who played with Melbourne and St Kilda in the Victorian Football League (VFL).

Notes

External links 
		
 
Demonwiki profile

1877 births
1936 deaths
Australian rules footballers from Victoria (Australia)
Melbourne Football Club players
St Kilda Football Club players